Kaadu may refer to:

 Kaadu (Star Wars), a fictional creature from the Star Wars franchise
 Kaadu (1952 film), an Indian-American film
 Kaadu (1973 Kannada film), Indian Kannada-language film
 Kaadu (1973 Malayalam film), Indian Malayalam-language film
 Kaadu (2014 film), Indian Tamil-language film